The 1940 Brown Bears football team was an American football team that represented Brown University as an independent during the 1940 college football season. In their 15th year under head coach Tuss McLaughry, the Bears compiled a 6–3–1 record and outscored opponents by a total of 124 to 94. The team played its home games at Brown Stadium in Providence, Rhode Island.

Schedule

References

Brown
Brown Bears football seasons
Brown Bears football